Todd Gerhart (born December 8, 1962) is a former American football running back who played one season with the Denver Gold of the United States Football League (USFL). He played college football at California State University, Fullerton. He was also a member of the Minnesota Vikings and Houston Oilers of the National Football League (NFL).

Early years
Gerhart played high school football at Norco High School in Norco, California and was inducted into the school's athletic hall of fame.

College career
Gerhart played for the Cal State Fullerton Titans from 1981 to 1984. He rushed for career totals of 867 yards and six touchdowns. He also caught 46 passes for 339 yards and one touchdown in his college career.

Professional career
Gerhart was selected by the Denver Gold of the USFL in the fifteenth round with the 209th overall pick of the 1985 USFL Collegiate Draft. He rushed for 279 yards and two touchdowns while also recording nine receptions for 125 yards in eighteen games for the Gold during the 1985 season. The USFL folded before the start of the 1986 season.

He spent time with the NFL's Minnesota Vikings during the 1986 off-season. Gerhart was released by the Vikings on August 22, 1986. He signed with the Houston Oilers of the NFL in March 1987. He was released before the start of the regular season.

Coaching career
Gerhart was the head football coach at Norco High School in Norco, California from 2004 to 2012, posting a combined record of 85–28. He helped the team advance to the CIF-SS championship game three straight years, winning titles in 2005 and 2006. His contract was not renewed in June 2013. Gerhart was also a physical education teacher at Norco.

Personal life
Gerhart's sons Toby and Garth have both played in the NFL. He also coached both of them at Norco High School. Another son, Coltin, played football for the Arizona State Sun Devils. He was also coached by Todd at Norco.

References

External links
Just Sports Stats
College stats

Living people
1962 births
American football running backs
Cal State Fullerton Titans football players
Denver Gold players
Minnesota Vikings players
Houston Oilers players
High school football coaches in California
21st-century American educators
Educators from California
Players of American football from California
Sportspeople from Riverside County, California
People from Norco, California